Jayojit Basu (born 14 September 1989) is an Indian cricketer. He plays first-class cricket for Bengal.

See also
 List of Bengal cricketers

References

External links
 

1989 births
Living people
Indian cricketers
Bengal cricketers
Cricketers from Kolkata